David J. Skalko is an American retired ice hockey forward and Air Force Colonel who was the de jure NCAA Scoring Champion in 1971–72.

Career
Skalko was admitted to the Air Force Academy in the fall of 1969 and joined the ice hockey team in its second season of existence. While training, he played four years of varsity hockey under the legendary Vic Heyliger. Due to the program being one of the only independent clubs in the country, Air Force's strength of schedule swung wildly from year to year. This resulted in Skalko's point total yo-yoing regardless of his play on the ice. As a junior, Skalko led the nation in scoring with 76 points, but there was a rather sizable caveat to his production. During the season Air Force had played more games against club teams (9) than University Division opponents (7). In those nine games, Air Force scored 96 goals, inflating the entire team's totals. While Air Force was a top division team, this resulted in Skalko's nation-leading total to be ignored and he wasn't even considered for any national honors. Since his 76 points was only 4 more than the next highest player, Doug Palazzari, Skalko is sometimes left off of the list for the NCAA scoring champion.

Regardless of the efficacy of Skalko's point total, the 1972 Air Force team was the first in program history to win 20 games. While the Falcon's couldn't maintain that pace in Skalko's senior season, he did end his career as the all-time leading scorer for the program. Skalko has slipped to third all-time for the Falcons as of 2020, but he sill holds the record for the most assists in a season (49) and a career (144) for the Academy.

After graduation, Skalko was commissioned as an officer and rose to the rank of Colonel before retiring.

Personal life
Skalko's brother Jim also attended the Air Force Academy and the two played together on the hockey team for three seasons.

Career statistics

Regular season and playoffs

References

External links

Living people
American ice hockey forwards
Ice hockey players from Minnesota
People from Gilbert, Minnesota
Air Force Falcons men's ice hockey players
Year of birth missing (living people)
Military personnel from Minnesota
United States Air Force Academy alumni